Haruna Aziz Zeego was elected Senator for the Kaduna South constituency of Kaduna State, Nigeria at the start of the Nigerian Fourth Republic, running on the People's Democratic Party (PDP) platform. He took office on 29 May 1999.
 
After taking his seat in the Senate in June 1999, he was appointed to committees on Aviation (vice-chairman), Police Affairs, Women Affairs, Internal Affairs, Tourism & Culture and Social Development & Sports.
Later he was appointed chairman of a committee on privatisation of the Nigerian Security Printing and Minting Company.
In May 2001, he called on the Independent National Electoral Commission to restore the two-party system to avoid the possibility of emergence of tribal parties.

References

Living people
People from Kaduna State
Peoples Democratic Party members of the Senate (Nigeria)
20th-century Nigerian politicians
21st-century Nigerian politicians
Year of birth missing (living people)